The Isnovăț is a right tributary of the river Prut in Romania. It flows into the Prut in Rădăuți-Prut.

References

Rivers of Romania
Rivers of Botoșani County
Tributaries of the Prut